is a district located in Fukushima Prefecture, Japan. It makes up the southern third of the Aizu region in western Fukushima Prefecture.

As of 2003, the district has an estimated population of 33,533 and a density of 14.32 persons per km2. The total area is 2,341.64 km2. It is the least populated part of Aizu.

Towns and villages
Minamiaizu
Shimogō
Tadami
Hinoemata

Merger
 On March 20, 2006 the town of Tajima, and the villages of Tateiwa, Ina and Nangō merged to form the new town of Minamiaizu.

Districts in Fukushima Prefecture
Giyōfū architecture